General Bravo is a municipality located in the state of Nuevo León in northeastern Mexico.

It is also the name of its municipal seat of government and main center of population.

History
General Bravo municipality and town is named after Nicolás Bravo, a hero of the Mexican War of Independence. 

It was founded on November 18, 1868.

External links
Generalbravo.gob.mx: official General Bravo municipal government website

Municipalities of Nuevo León
Populated places in Nuevo León
Lower Rio Grande Valley
Populated places established in 1868
1860s establishments in Mexico